James Byrnes may refer to:

James Byrnes (Australian politician) (1806–1886), New South Wales politician
James Byrnes (sailor) (1838–1882), Irish sailor and Medal of Honor recipient
James F. Byrnes (1882–1972), American politician and Supreme Court Justice from South Carolina
Jim Byrnes (baseball) (1880–1941), American baseball player
Jim Byrnes (actor) (born 1948), American actor and blues musician

See also
James Burns (disambiguation)
James Burnes (disambiguation)
James Byrne (disambiguation)